Boa... Nguu yak! also known as just Boa and Constrictor, is a 2006 Thai horror film directed by Chaninton Muangsuwan and stars Pimpan Chalaikupp and Sittha Lertsrimonkol.

Synopsis
A group of teenagers journey by balloon to a remote forest in search of a friend who's gone missing after his trip that he took for a film project. En route, a brutal storm takes them down in the middle of the forest. The teenagers are forced to take shelter in a dark cave, unaware that an unusual creature is silently resting there. It is not too long before they discover the terrible thing deep inside the cave, a ferocious and enormous Boa. They have no choice but to fight for their lives.

Cast
 Pimpan Chalaikupp as Nattacha
 Sittha Lertsrimonkol as Soet
 Kiratikorn Ratkulthorn as Phrae
 Nophand Boonyai as Khin
 Tawngrak Assawarat as Sida
 Phoophan Khannathap as Go

Release
The film was released in Thailand on April 27, 2006, in the Philippines on November 1, 2006, and in Kuwait on October 8, 2009. As of 2018 there are no plans for it to be released in the United States.

Reception
The film has received very negative reviews.

Robert Beveridge of Popcorn for Breakfast: "All the SFCOM markers are here. There’s bad CGI, awful script, generic cute chicks (and one who’s supposed to be the “plain” intelligent one who's actually hotter than the rest of the bunch: in this movie, that's Kiratikorn Ratkulthorn, in her first but hopefully not last film), monsters that do nothing you'd think they would do, etc.

AnimalAttack called the film average and gave it a score of 3 out of 6.

Box office
In its opening weekend in Thailand the film came in second at the box office grossing $167,154. In its second weekend the film dropped 74.8% and grossed $42,150. The film went on to gross $302,950.

Home media
The film was released on DVD in Hungary on January 15, 2010 and was later released in France on July 20, 2010.

See also
 List of killer snake films

References

External links
 

2006 films
2006 horror films
2000s thriller films
2006 science fiction action films
Thai horror films
Thai-language films
2000s monster movies
Thai monster movies
Films about snakes
Natural horror films
Sahamongkol Film International films